The 2010 French Open was a tennis tournament played on outdoor clay courts. It was the 114th edition of the French Open, and the second Grand Slam event of the year. It took place at the Stade Roland Garros in Paris, France, from 23 May through 6 June 2010.

Roger Federer and Svetlana Kuznetsova were the defending champions. Federer lost to Robin Söderling in the quarterfinals, while Kuznetsova lost to Maria Kirilenko in the third round.

The 2010 French Open also featured the return of four-time champion Justine Henin, who retired immediately before the 2008 French Open, where she was the 3-time defending champion.

Singles players
Men's singles

Women's singles

Day-by-day summaries

Seniors

Men's singles

 Rafael Nadal defeated  Robin Söderling, 6–4, 6–2, 6–4
It was Nadal's 4th title of this year and the 40th of his career. It was his fifth win in six years at Roland Garros and his seventh Grand Slam men's singles victory.
Nadal reclaimed the No. 1 ATP ranking with this victory.
Nadal's victory also completed a historic 'Clay Slam' for Nadal, seeing him become the first person in history to win all Masters 1000 tournaments on clay (Monte Carlo, Rome and Madrid), as well as the French Open, in the same calendar year.
This was the second time Nadal had won the French Open without dropping a set.

Women's singles

 Francesca Schiavone defeated  Samantha Stosur, 6–4, 7–6(7–2)
Both Schiavone and Stosur were first-time Grand Slam finalists.
It was Schiavone's second title of the year, the fourth of her career, and her first major title.

Men's doubles

 Daniel Nestor /  Nenad Zimonjić defeated  Lukáš Dlouhý /  Leander Paes, 7–5, 6–2

Women's doubles

 Serena Williams /  Venus Williams defeated  Květa Peschke /  Katarina Srebotnik, 6–2, 6–3
 The Williams sisters won their 12th Grand Slam doubles title and 2nd at the French Open. With this, they hold all Grand Slam doubles titles simultaneously.
 Also, they have won the career women's doubles golden slam for the second time in their respective careers.

Mixed doubles

 Katarina Srebotnik /  Nenad Zimonjić defeated  Yaroslava Shvedova /  Julian Knowle, 4–6, 7–6(7–5), [11–9]
 Srebotnik and Zimonjić both won their fourth Grand Slam mixed doubles title.

Juniors

Boys' singles

 Agustín Velotti defeated  Andrea Collarini, 6–4, 7–5

Girls' singles

 Elina Svitolina defeated  Ons Jabeur, 6–2, 7–5
 Svitolina won her first Junior Grand Slam title.

Boys' doubles

 Duilio Beretta /  Roberto Quiroz defeated  Facundo Argüello /  Agustín Velotti, 6–3, 6–2
 Beretta and Quiroz win their first junior Grand Slam title in doubles.

Girls' doubles

 Tímea Babos /  Sloane Stephens defeated  Lara Arruabarrena /  María Teresa Torró Flor, 6–2, 6–3
 Babos and Stephens win their first junior Grand Slam title in doubles.

Other events

Legends under 45 doubles

 Yevgeny Kafelnikov /  Andriy Medvedev defeated  Goran Ivanišević /  Michael Stich, 6–1, 6–1

Legends over 45 doubles

 John McEnroe /  Andrés Gómez defeated  Mansour Bahrami /  Henri Leconte, 6–1, 6–1

Women's legends doubles

 Martina Navratilova /  Jana Novotná defeated  Iva Majoli /  Nathalie Tauziat, 6–4, 6–2

Wheelchair men's singles

 Shingo Kunieda defeated  Stefan Olsson, 6–4, 6–0
 Kunieda won his tenth wheelchair Grand Slam singles title, and his fourth at the French Open.

Wheelchair women's singles

 Esther Vergeer defeated  Sharon Walraven, 6–0, 6–0
 Vergeer won her 15th wheelchair Grand Slam singles title, and her fourth at the French Open.

Wheelchair men's doubles

 Stéphane Houdet /  Shingo Kunieda defeated  Robin Ammerlaan /  Stefan Olsson, 6–0, 5–7, [10–8]
 Houdet wins his fourth wheelchair Grand Slam doubles title and the first at French Open, and Kunieda wins his ninth wheelchair Grand Slam doubles title and second at French.

Wheelchair women's doubles

 Daniela Di Toro /  Aniek van Koot defeated  Esther Vergeer /  Sharon Walraven, 3–6, 6–3, [10–4]
 Di Toro and van Koot win their first wheelchair Grand Slam title in doubles.

Singles seeds 
The following are the seeded players and notable players who withdrew from the event. Seedings based on ATP and WTA rankings as of 17 May 2010. Rank and points before are as of 24 May 2010.

Men's singles 

†The player did not qualify for the tournament in 2009. Accordingly, this was the 18th best result deducted instead.

The following players would have been seeded, but they withdrew from the event.

Women's singles 

†The player did not qualify the tournament in 2009. Accordingly, this was the 16th best result deducted instead.

The following players would have been seeded, but they withdrew from the event.

Wildcard entries
Below are the lists of the wildcard awardees entering in the main draws.

Men's singles wildcard entries
  Ryan Sweeting
  Carsten Ball
  David Guez
  Nicolas Mahut
  Gianni Mina
  Josselin Ouanna
  Laurent Recouderc
  Édouard Roger-Vasselin

Women's singles wildcard entries
  Christina McHale
  Jarmila Groth
  Stéphanie Cohen-Aloro
  Claire Feuerstein
  Stéphanie Foretz
  Mathilde Johansson
  Kristina Mladenovic
  Olivia Sanchez

Men's doubles wildcard entries
  Thierry Ascione /  Laurent Recouderc
  Nicolas Devilder /  Paul-Henri Mathieu
  Jonathan Eysseric /  Benoît Paire
  Richard Gasquet /  Sébastien Grosjean
  Marc Gicquel /  Édouard Roger-Vasselin
  Guillaume Rufin /  Alexandre Sidorenko

Women's doubles wildcard entries
  Séverine Brémond Beltrame /  Youlia Fedossova
  Stéphanie Cohen-Aloro /  Pauline Parmentier
  Claire Feuerstein /  Stéphanie Foretz
  Mathilde Johansson /  Camille Pin
  Sophie Lefèvre /  Aurélie Védy
  Kristina Mladenovic /  Selima Sfar
  Irena Pavlovic /  Laura Thorpe

Mixed doubles wildcard entries
  Stéphanie Cohen-Aloro /  Thierry Ascione
  Julie Coin /  Nicolas Mahut
  Mathilde Johansson /  Sébastien de Chaunac
  Kristina Mladenovic /  Alexandre Sidorenko
  Pauline Parmentier /  Marc Gicquel
  Aurélie Védy /  Michaël Llodra

Protected ranking
The following players were accepted directly into the main draw using a protected ranking: 

Men's Singles
  Robin Haase
  Kei Nishikori
  Dmitry Tursunov
  Kristof Vliegen

Women's Singles
  Katarina Srebotnik

Qualifiers entries

Men's qualifiers entries

  Pablo Andújar
  Yuri Schukin
  Olivier Patience
  Jesse Witten
  Thiago Alves
  Somdev Devvarman
  Michael Yani
  Stefano Galvani
  Teymuraz Gabashvili
  Jorge Aguilar
  Benoît Paire
  Martin Fischer
  Julian Reister
  Grega Žemlja
  Simone Bolelli
  Tobias Kamke

The following players received the lucky loser spot:
  Santiago Ventura
  Dieter Kindlmann

Women's qualifiers entries

  Heidi El Tabakh
  Kurumi Nara
  Ekaterina Ivanova
  Sophie Ferguson
  Zhang Shuai
  Anastasia Pivovarova
  Ksenia Pervak
  Misaki Doi
  Simona Halep
  Kaia Kanepi
  Nuria Llagostera Vives
  Chanelle Scheepers

The following player received the lucky loser spot:
  Bethanie Mattek-Sands

Withdrawals
The following players were accepted directly into the main tournament, but withdrew with injuries or personal reasons.

Men's Singles
  Mario Ančić → replaced by  Santiago Ventura
  Igor Andreev → replaced by  Kevin Anderson
  James Blake → replaced by  Michał Przysiężny
  Nikolay Davydenko → replaced by  Paolo Lorenzi
  Juan Martín del Potro → replaced by  Daniel Gimeno Traver
  Tommy Haas → replaced by  Ricardo Mello
  Ivo Karlović → replaced by  Kei Nishikori
  Florian Mayer → replaced by  Dieter Kindlmann
  Carlos Moyá → replaced by  Robby Ginepri
  David Nalbandian → replaced by  Taylor Dent
  Gilles Simon → replaced by  Igor Kunitsyn
  Radek Štěpánek → replaced by  Robin Haase

Women's Singles
  Kim Clijsters → replaced by  Stéphanie Dubois
  Anna-Lena Grönefeld → replaced by  Ekaterina Bychkova
  Sabine Lisicki → replaced by  Johanna Larsson
  Sania Mirza → replaced by  Anne Keothavong
  Peng Shuai → replaced by  Bethanie Mattek-Sands
  Urszula Radwańska → replaced by  Katie O'Brien

Point distribution

Prize money
All prize money is in Euros (€); doubles prize money is distributed per pair.

Men's and women's singles 
 Winners: €1,120,000
 Runners-up: €560,000
 Semi-finalists: €280,000
 Quarter-finalists: €140,000
 Fourth round: €70,000
 Third round: €42,000
 Second round: €25,000
 First round: €15,000

Men's and women's doubles 
 Winners: €320,000
 Runners-up: €160,000
 Semi-finalists: €80,000
 Quarter-finalists: €40,000
 Third round: €22,000
 Second round: €11,000
 First round: €7,500

Mixed doubles 
 Winners: €100,000
 Runners-up: €50,000
 Semi-finalists: €25,000
 Quarter-finalists: €13,000
 Second round: €7,000
 First round: €3,500

Media coverage
 Australia: Nine, Fox Sports
 Canada: TSN, RDS
 Brazil:  ESPN, ESPN Brasil
 United States: NBC, ESPN2, Tennis Channel
 Europe: Eurosport
Domestic rights have also been sold to the following broadcasters, who may only cover the later rounds or not show any coverage at all, depending on the progress of domestic players:
 Austria: ORF
 Belgium: RTBF, VRT
 Bosnia and Herzegovina: BHRT
 Croatia: HRT
 Cyprus: CyBC
 Denmark: TV2 Sport
 France: France Télévisions, Orange Sport
 Finland: MTV3, FST5
 Germany: ARD, ZDF
 Greece: ERT, ANT1, Mega Channel
 Ireland: TG4
 Montenegro: RTCG
 Netherlands: NOS
 Romania: TVR
 Russia: Eurosport, Russia 2
 Serbia: RTS
 Slovenia: RTV Slovenija
 Spain: TVE
 Sweden: SVT
 Switzerland: SRG-SSR
 Turkey: TRT
 United Kingdom: BBC
 People's Republic of China: CCTV
 Hong Kong: Now Sports
 India: ESPN STAR Sports
 Japan: Wowow
 Macao: TDM
 Malaysia: Astro
 Morocco: SNRT
 New Zealand: Sky Sport
 Thailand: TV7, True Sport
Sub-Saharan Africa: Supersport
Middle East and North Africa: Al Jazeera Sports
Latin America: ESPN Latin America
 Philippines: Balls, Studio 23
 Singapore: Starhub

Miscellaneous
Rafael Nadal's victory marked the fifth consecutive year that the No.2 seed won the tournament (Nadal in 2006, 2007, 2008 and 2010, and Roger Federer in 2009).
Part of the music video of the Martin Solveig song "Hello" was filmed at Roland Garros prior to the tournament starting.

References

External links

Official website

 
2010 WTA Tour
2010 in French tennis
2010 ATP World Tour
May 2010 sports events in France
June 2010 sports events in France
2010 in Paris